Dauntsey Park House is a Grade II* listed country house in Dauntsey, Wiltshire, England. It is based on a 14th-century manor, remodelled in the late 17th century or early 18th, and altered again c.1800 when it was recased in ashlar.

References

External links 
 Dauntsey Park House

Grade II* listed houses
Grade II* listed buildings in Wiltshire
Country houses in Wiltshire
Houses completed in 1800